In mathematics, Spence's function, or dilogarithm, denoted as , is a particular case of the polylogarithm. Two related special functions are referred to as Spence's function, the dilogarithm itself:
 
and its reflection.
For , an infinite series also applies (the integral definition constitutes its analytical extension to the complex plane):

Alternatively, the dilogarithm function is sometimes defined as 

In hyperbolic geometry the dilogarithm can be used to compute the volume of an ideal simplex. Specifically, a simplex whose vertices have cross ratio  has hyperbolic volume

The function  is sometimes called the Bloch-Wigner function. Lobachevsky's function and Clausen's function are closely related functions.

William Spence, after whom the function was named by early writers in the field, was a Scottish mathematician working in the early nineteenth century. He was at school with John Galt, who later wrote a biographical essay on Spence.

Analytic structure
The standard choice of branch cut is along the positive real axis . However, the function is continuous at the branch point and takes on the value .

Identities

Particular value identities

Special values

 where  is the Riemann zeta function.

In particle physics
Spence's Function is commonly encountered in particle physics while calculating radiative corrections. In this context, the function is often defined with an absolute value inside the logarithm:

Notes

References

Further reading

External links 
NIST Digital Library of Mathematical Functions: Dilogarithm
 

Special functions